Daikichi is a masculine Japanese given name. Notable people with the name include:

, Japanese sumo wrestler
, Japanese comedian
, Japanese historian
, Japanese rower
, Japanese actor

Fictional characters
, protagonist of the manga series Bunny Drop

Japanese masculine given names